Swavesey Village College is a village college and academy school in the village of Swavesey in south Cambridgeshire, England. As of 2010 the school has around 1,200 students. The school was officially opened on 14 November 1958.

The school has a major intake from the surrounding villages Bar Hill, Over, Papworth Everard, Longstanton and Fenstanton. A few other villages are Fen Drayton, Hilton, Boxworth, Elsworth, Lolworth and Willingham, however not as many students come from these schools.

On 11 June 2008, Swavesey Village College became a foundation school within the Swavesey Village College Educational Trust. On 1 April 2011, Swavesey Village College became an academy. The school also has specialisms in science and languages.

Swavesey Village College received a comment of 'outstanding in every respect' from the Ofsted inspectors. The school achieved full marks in every category in the Ofsted report.

The school runs many after school extra curricular clubs, which vary in category greatly, from sports to maths to journalism and to chess.

The school is able to accept students with learning disabilities including autism.

House system 
The school is divided into six houses. Students are normally assigned to houses at random on enrolment, however, siblings are often assigned to the same houses as they will most likely not be in the same form.

The houses occupy different blocks of the school correlating to which subject the person the house is named after was prominent in. For example, Orwell house, named after George Orwell, is in the English block of the school as well as the languages block.

Each house is named after an influential person in history, and this generally reflects the subjects administered by that house. While each house has its own colour, this is not reflected in school or sports uniforms and is only usually seen on a house's noticeboard as to distinguish it from those of other houses.

An inter-house competition known as the 'Swavesey Superleague' runs each year, with houses gaining points for being successful in various competitions throughout the year. The pupils of the winning house usually receive some sort of reward or prize at the end of the school year.

Classrooms are named after houses. They contain the first letter of the house and then a number, with the exception of 'A' rooms for Achievement Support, which do not have usual lessons. If a teacher has a form, they will often teach in their form room, but sometimes teaches in another teacher's. The science, computing and engineering classes are very different to others. The two Sports classrooms (though some groups are taught outside) are big halls. Some teachers give seating plans, often boy-girl, but some let students choose at the start of the year.

External links 
 Official website

Academies in Cambridgeshire
1958 establishments in England
Secondary schools in Cambridgeshire
Educational institutions established in 1958